OBH may refer to:
 Ole Bødtcher-Hansen A/S (often marketed as "OBH"), a Danish company that became OBH Nordica via a 2002 merger
 Oak Bay High School in Oak Bay, British Columbia, Canada
 Old Buckenham Hall School, a school in the village of Brettenham, Suffolk, England
 The Outer Banks Hospital, a critical access hospital located in North Carolina, United States
 Original Block Hustlaz, a record label and group associated with American rapper AR-Ab
 , a Latin-script trigraphs used in Irish